(Alexander) Ewen Ratteray was the Bishop of Bermuda.

Born on 18 February 1942 and educated at Codrington College, Barbados, he was ordained in 1966. After a curacy in Pontefract he began to proceed in Church ordained ministries: being successively Vicar of Airedale  then Archdeacon of Bermuda before his translation to the episcopacy in 1996. He is now retired.

References

1942 births
20th-century Anglican bishops in Bermuda
Anglican bishops of Bermuda
Living people
Archdeacons of Bermuda
21st-century Anglican bishops in Bermuda